National Secondary Route 239, is a road in Costa Rica between Ciudad Colón, San José province and Parrita, Puntarenas province. It is the main access road of the Puriscal canton of San José province.  From Puriscal to Parrita, the road is dirt and gravel.

Description
In San José province the route covers Puriscal canton (Santiago, Mercedes Sur, San Antonio, Chires districts), Mora canton (Colón, Guayabo, Jaris, Quitirrisí districts).

History
Received mayor improvements in 2019, where gabion walls were constructed near Puriscal downtown to stabilize the sides of the road, similar work was done at Route 317.

On October 4, 2019, the central government announced plans to invest CRC ₡7,083,000,000 to pave with asphalt the 51.89 km gravel road between Puriscal and Parrita, due to its importance as an alternative route from the Greater Metropolitan Area to the Pacific. For forty five years, a local committee asked for this work to be done. Works will start in April 2020, with the first 10 kilometers awarded to a private contractor.

This route was severely damaged in November 2020 due to the indirect effects of Hurricane Eta.

References

Highways in Costa Rica